Yarm is a railway station on the Northallerton–Eaglescliffe Line, which connects the East Coast Main Line and Tees Valley Line. It is owned by Network Rail and managed by TransPennine Express.

History
The station was originally opened by the Leeds Northern Railway on 25 May 1852. It was closed by British Rail on 4 January 1960. The former station building is still in place today, and is situated on the north side of Yarm Viaduct, in County Durham.

The viaduct was designed a Grade II listed structure on 23 June 1966.

Facilities

The station is unstaffed, but a self-service ticket machine is available, which allows intending passengers to buy tickets before boarding or collect advance purchase/pre-paid tickets. There are waiting shelters, a customer help point, timetable posters and real-time information displays on both platforms. There is also a large free car park.

Both platforms have step-free access, and can be accessed by ramps from the road bridge on Green Lane.

Services
As of the December 2022 timetable change, the station is served by an hourly service between Saltburn and Manchester Airport via York.

Rolling stock used: Class 185 Desiro

References

Sources

External links
 
 

Railway stations in the Borough of Stockton-on-Tees
DfT Category F2 stations
Former North Eastern Railway (UK) stations
Railway stations in Great Britain opened in 1852
Railway stations in Great Britain closed in 1960
Railway stations in Great Britain opened in 1996
Railway stations served by TransPennine Express
1852 establishments in England
Yarm